The BMW M12/13 turbo was a 1499.8 cc 4-cylinder turbocharged Formula One engine, based on the standard BMW M10 engine introduced in 1961, powered the F1 cars of Brabham, Arrows and Benetton.  Nelson Piquet won the FIA Formula One Drivers' Championship in 1983 driving a Brabham powered by the BMW M12/13 turbo. It was the first Drivers' Championship to be won using a turbocharged engine. The engine also powered the BMW GTP and in the 2.0-litre naturally-aspirated form, the successful March Engineering Formula Two cars. BMW engineers figured the engine produced around 1,400 hp at maximum boost, however the BMW engine dynamometer could not go beyond 1,280 bhp.

History

Formula 2
As BMW M12/7, the engine design since the 1960s became one of the most successful engines in racing. In the Deutsche Rennsport Meisterschaft, a 1400 cc variant (with a 1.4 handicap factor equal to 2000cc) was turbocharged by Paul Rosche according to FIA Group 5 rules. After some development, power, driveability, and reliability improved, especially in the IMSA car, and BMW began to think about entering F1, where a handicap factor of 2.0 required 1500 cc engines.

Formula One
During the  season, the Brabham team, then owned by future F1 boss Bernie Ecclestone, used both the older Cosworth DFV V8 engine as well as the turbocharged BMW M12 in selected races in a development program. The BMW proved to be fast in its first year in Formula One, though its reliability with turbocharging still in its infancy was lacking. Reigning World Champion Nelson Piquet recorded the first win for the engine in F1 when he led home Brabham teammate Riccardo Patrese (in the Cosworth-powered car) at the 1982 Canadian Grand Prix.

Piquet was the first driver to win a World Championship in a turbo-powered car.

The main advantage of the inline-4 M12 over its V6 Ferrari and Renault opposition was that, with one fewer turbo, two fewer cylinders, and eight fewer valves, the BMW engine had lower frictional losses and, therefore, produced less waste heat. This allowed Brahbam's lead designer Gordon Murray the luxury of designing the BT52 with smaller radiators, which meant better aerodynamic efficiency and thus better straight-line speed. The BT52 was notable for its very skinny, short sidepods especially compared to the Renault, giving it better penetration through the air on circuits with long straights.

However, the engine's mechanical reliability and durability under full workload suffered severely, with engine blow-ups and turbo failures becoming common occurrences. Furthermore, with FISA imposing a maximum fuel limit of 220 litres per race (refuelling was allowed in 1982 and 1983), the 4-cylinder BMW suffered from high fuel consumption which often led to drivers running out of fuel and continued to suffer from poor reliability. Consequently, Piquet scored only three wins - the 1984 Canadian and Detroit races, and the 1985 French Grand Prix. These proved to be Brabham's final wins in Formula 1.

For , the M12 was upgraded into the M12/13/1. At the time, there was no way to accurately measure horsepower figures over 1,000, and so claimed output figures were generally accepted from the engineers' theoretical calculations; for example, 0.1 bar of turbo boost was rated to be worth approximately ). In fact, the top five cars through the speed trap at Monza (Berger and teammate Teo Fabi, Brabham's Derek Warwick and Riccardo Patrese, and the Arrows of Thierry Boutsen) were all powered by the BMW M12.

Brabham tilted the upgraded engine sideways by 72° for use in the extremely low BT55, but the concept proved unsuccessful, most likely due to cooling issues in the tight compartment. Instead, Benetton with the more conventional B186 were the leading BMW users in 1986, with Gerhard Berger scoring his and the team's first (and the BMW engine's last) win at the Mexican Grand Prix.

BMW announced their withdrawal from F1 at the end of 1986, but that they would continue to honour their contract and supply, Brabham, with their tilted M12s for 1987. Arrows team boss Jackie Oliver, with support from the team's primary sponsor USF&G, brokered a deal to continue the use of the upright BMW engines under the name of its subsidiary Megatron, Inc., founded by long-time F1 aficionado John J. Schmidt. The engines were serviced from Switzerland by Arrows' long time engine guru Heini Mader, a former mechanic of Jo Siffert.

Megatron

By 1988, Arrows were one of only six teams still running turbocharged engines, and the Megatrons were the oldest turbo engine still in use in Formula One, Ferrari having introduced a brand-new turbo engine the previous year.

The Megatron programme ended after 1988 as a result of rule changes that banned turbocharged engines from 1989 onwards, with Eddie Cheever scoring the old BMW engine's last podium finish with third place in the 1988 Italian Grand Prix at Monza. This race was also significant as it marked the first time Heini Mader had solved the problems caused by the FIA's boost limit valve, which limited turbo boost pressure to 4.0 bar in 1987 and 2.5 bar in 1988. By moving the valve closer to the engine, the problem of the turbo not delivering enough boost had been solved, and the Arrows A10B was among the fastest cars on the long Monza straights, faster even than the all-conquering McLaren-Hondas into which designer Steve Nichols had effectively incorporated elements of Gordon Murray's low-line Brabham design as well as featuring a more powerful V6 engine.

With turbos banned from the  season, the Arrows team reverted to using , naturally aspirated Ford DFR V8 power plants.

The M12's major shortcoming as a Formula One engine was its lack of throttle response due to turbo lag. Unlike the V6 and V8 turbocharged engines which ran with twin turbos (one for each bank of cylinders), the inline-4 BMW engine, like the other 4 cylinder turbo engines used in F1 such as the Hart 415T and the Zakspeed 1500/4, only used a single turbocharger. The twin-turbo setups of the "V" engines eliminated much of the turbo lag. However, with only a single turbo, the BMW M12 suffered from approximately 2 seconds of turbo lag, meaning drivers often had to start accelerating through the apex of a corner. The power from the turbo was described by many (including Piquet and Berger) as coming on like a light switch which often induced sudden oversteer. Consequently, the BMW was usually seen at its most competitive at power circuits such as Kyalami, Imola, Paul Ricard, Silverstone, Hockenheim, the Österreichring and Monza. On tighter tracks such as street circuits like Monaco and Detroit which required greater acceleration and less top speed, the BMW-powered cars often lagged behind their major rivals.

Formula One record
World Championships:  1 (Nelson Piquet in a Brabham in )
Wins:  9 (Piquet 7, Riccardo Patrese 1, Gerhard Berger 1)
Pole Positions: 15 (Piquet 12, Teo Fabi 2, Patrese 1)
Fastest Laps: 14 (Piquet 9, Patrese 2, Berger 2, Fabi 1)

Complete Formula One Championship results
(key) (Results in bold indicate pole position; results in italics indicate fastest lap)

* Ineligible for points.

References

External links

 http://www.gurneyflap.com/bmwturbof1engine.html
 http://grandprix.com/gpe/eng-megat.html
 http://www.imca-slotracing.com/2008-XMAS3.htm
 http://www.statsf1.com/en/moteur-bmw.aspx

M12 Megatron
Formula One engines
Straight-four engines